The Masonic Temple is a historic fraternal and commercial building at East Fourth Avenue and State Street in Pine Bluff, Arkansas. Fundraising for the building was led by Joseph Carter Corbin and J. N. Donohoo. It is a four-story brick building, built between 1902 and 1904 by the state's African-American Masonic lodge, the Sovereign Grand Lodge of Free and Accepted Masons.  It was at the time Pine Bluff's tallest building; the ground floor held retail space, the second floor professional offices, and the upper floors were devoted to the Masonic organizations.

The building was listed on the National Register of Historic Places in 1978.

See also
National Register of Historic Places listings in Jefferson County, Arkansas

References

1902 establishments in Arkansas
Buildings and structures in Pine Bluff, Arkansas
Clubhouses on the National Register of Historic Places in Arkansas
Masonic buildings completed in 1902
Prince Hall Masonic buildings in the United States
Masonic buildings in Arkansas
National Register of Historic Places in Pine Bluff, Arkansas
Individually listed contributing properties to historic districts on the National Register in Arkansas